Lorena Arenas Campuzano (born September 17, 1993 in Pereira, Colombia) is a Colombian race walker. She won the silver medal in the 2020 Summer Olympics in Tokyo in the 20 kilometer race walk. She competed at the 2012 Summer Olympics in London in the 20 kilometer race walk.

In May 2012, Arenas won the women's 10 kilometer event (junior event) at the 2012 IAAF World Race Walking Cup in Saransk, Russia. In July 2012, Arenas won the bronze medal in the 10km race walk event at the 2012 World Junior Championships in Athletics with a time of 45:44.46. Arenas placed 32nd in 20km race walk at the 2012 Summer Olympics with a time of 1:33:21. She Again Placed 32nd at the 2016 Summer Olympics, with a time of 1:35:40; She went on to Place Second in the 2020 Summer Olympics, with a time of 1:29:37.

Personal bests

Track walk
5000 m: 21:30.33 (ht) –  Melbourne, 5 March 2023
10,000 m: 42:02.99 –  Trujillo, 25 August 2018
20,000 m: 1:31:02.25 (ht) –  Lima, 13 June 2015

Road walk
10 km: 43:16 –  Suzhou, 25 September 2017
20 km: 1:28:03 –  Lima, 4 August 2019

Achievements

References

External links

 Sandra Arenas at London2012.com
 
 

1993 births
Living people
Colombian female racewalkers
Olympic athletes of Colombia
Olympic female racewalkers
Athletes (track and field) at the 2012 Summer Olympics
Athletes (track and field) at the 2016 Summer Olympics
Athletes (track and field) at the 2020 Summer Olympics
Athletes (track and field) at the 2015 Pan American Games
Athletes (track and field) at the 2019 Pan American Games
World Athletics Championships athletes for Colombia
South American Games gold medalists for Colombia
South American Games medalists in athletics
Competitors at the 2014 South American Games
Central American and Caribbean Games silver medalists for Colombia
Competitors at the 2014 Central American and Caribbean Games
Pan American Games gold medalists for Colombia
Pan American Games medalists in athletics (track and field)
Central American and Caribbean Games medalists in athletics
Medalists at the 2019 Pan American Games
Ibero-American Championships in Athletics winners
Medalists at the 2020 Summer Olympics
Olympic silver medalists in athletics (track and field)
Olympic silver medalists for Colombia
People from Pereira, Colombia
21st-century Colombian women